This is an alphabetical list of songs written or co-written by the American singer-songwriter Frank J. Myers.

Song (date), Writers - Artist

0-9
100 Days, 100 Nights - 98 Degrees, Stephen Craig
3935 West End Ave - Mason-Dixon

A
Alvarado - Alvarado
A Man’s Not a Man (Till He’s Loved By A Woman) - Barbara Mandrell
A Rose in the Sand - The Shoppe
Any Ole Stretch of Blacktop, Myers/Nelson - Collin Raye, Shenandoah, Alan Jackson
Another Day Goes By - Stephen Craig
As Long as You Want Me To - Ronan Keating

B 
 Bad Habits - Mel McDaniel
 Bayou Boys - Eddy Raven
 Beautiful Life - Donny & Marie
 Beautiful Women- Whiskey Falls
 Boys Like Us (2006), Geiger/Martin/Myers - Heartland
 Bending Rules and Breaking Hearts - High Noon
 Burning a Hole in My Head, Griggs/Kees/Myers/McBride – Andy Griggs

C
Carry the Cross (2007), Myers/Rausch/McDonald - Richie McDonald
Changes - Tanya Tucker, Eddy Raven
Class Reunion (That Used to Be Us), Pfrimmer/Myers/McDonald - Lonestar
Come In Out of the Pain, Myers/Pfrimmer - Doug Stone
Cross My Heart - All-4-One

D
Don’t Look In My Eyes - Barbara Mandrell (1985), Joan Kennedy (1987)

E
Early in the Morning and Late at Night - Hank Williams, Jr.
Entre Dos – Fey - Mexico
Everyday I Love You - Boyzone

F
Faith (2007), Myers/Eustice/McDonald - Richie McDonald
Find a Way - Richie McDonald
Five Days of Glory - Krista Marie
Folks Out on the Road, Myers/Raven - Eddy Raven, Waylon Jennings & Johnny Cash
Forever One – Steven Craig

G
Goin’ Down – Steven Craig
Gotta Get Next to That - Ariel Rivera
God's Got This - Frank Myers

H
Heart of Innocence - Jessica Simpson
He’s Alive (2004), Myers/McDonald - Richie McDonald
Holding the Family Together - The Shoppe
House of Pain – Andy Griggs

I
I Can't Wait - Marie Osmond, Stephen Craig
I Don’t Know How (Not to Love You) - Uncle Kracker
I Don't Feel Anything - Stephen Craig
I Don't Want to Hate You Anymore, Myers/Loggins - Kenny Loggins
I Don’t Wanna Say Goodbye - Kathie Lee Gifford
I Got Mexico - Eddy Raven
I Live, Baker/Myers/Malloy - Tim Rushlow
I Love You Enough to Let You Go - Baker/Myers/Owen - Alabama
I Still Believe in That (2011) - Bowers/Smith/Myers - Ash Bowers
I Swear (1987), Baker/Myers - John Michael Montgomery (1993), All-4-One (1994), Kenny Rogers, and many others...
I Turn to You, Myers/Kohen - Richie McDonald
I Wanna Get to Ya, Baker/Myers/Malloy - Billy Gilman
I Want My Life Back - Bucky Covington
I Wonder What the Rich Folk Are Doin’ Tonight - Barbara Mandrell
I'm Already There (2001), Baker/Myers/Mcdonald - Lonestar, Westlife
I’m Here for You - Frank Myers, Billy Montana
I'm Just Sayin - Matt Gary
I’m Waiting for You - Alicia Elliott
Ibiza, Myers/Raven - P.A.T, Thomas Erbrecht
If Everyday Could Be Christmas - 98 Degrees, Lonestar, Richie McDonald
If I Could Only Bring You Back - Joe Diffie
If It’s Not One Thing It’s Another - Barbara Mandrell
In Between – Hannah Sarah Tan
In My Life – Stephen Craig
Innocent Years - High Noon
It's as Simple as That, Mcdonald/Baker/Myers - Lonestar

L
Last Train Running, B.Brandt/W.Brandt/Myers/Williams – Whiskey Falls
Left, Leavin’, Goin’ or Gone, Myers/Pfrimmer - Noel Haggard, Doug Stone
Life’s Too Short to Love This Fast, Baker/Myers/Owen - Alabama
Living in Black and White, Lawrence/Baker/Myers - Tracy Lawrence
Lonely at the Right Time, Myers/Pfrimmer - Tanya Tucker
Long Stretch of Lonesome, Myers/Griggs/Montana – Andy Griggs
Lost in Heaven - Alicia Elliott & Stephen Craig
Love in Motion (Think About Us) - Ross Lewis
Love Is Burning, Kees/Myers - Ricky Van Shelton
Love Me Baby - The Pink Stilettos, Pop Stars Europe

M
Make a Miracle- Alabama & Various Artists
Man af Steel – Whiskey Falls
Measure of a Man - Richie McDonald
Missed It Again - Anne West
My Front Porch Looking In (2003), McDonald/Myers/Pfrimmer - Lonestar
My Bad - Kate Bradshaw, Sofia-Sweden

N
Not Every Man Lives, Brice/Montana/Myers – Jason Aldean
Nothing but the Radio, Myers/Teren - Joe Diffie
Nothing’s Gonna Break My Love - Kate Bradshaw, Hasha(Latin)

O
Once Upon a Lifetime (1993), Baker/Myers - Alabama, Ronan Keating
One Foot on the Street - Sylvia
One Honest Heart (1998), Baker/Myers/Malloy - Reba McEntire
Other Than Montreal - Eddy Raven

R
Right Here Waiting – Stephen Craig
Risky Business - Eddy Raven
Rocks and Honey - Bonnie Tyler
Runaway - The Pink Stilettos, Pop Stars Europe

S
Sex Politics and Money - Stephan Craig 
She Doesn't Know - Stephan Craig
She Loves Me - High Noon
Silently Saying Good-Bye - Stephan Craig
Simple as That, McDonald/Baker/Myers - Lonestar
Slow Down – Richie McDonald
Some Bridges Won’t Burn - Ross Lewis
Someday Somewhere - Bradshaw/Myers- Kate Bradshaw / Liriel Domiciano(Spain)
Someone Barrowed Someone Blue - Eddy Raven
Sometimes a Lady - Eddy Raven
Squeeze Me - Ronnie McDowell
Standing Still - Kate Bradshaw
Stay with Me Lord - Richie McDonald
Stuck Myers/Billy Montana - Ash Bowers
Sweet Contractions, Myers/Palmer - Rissi Palmer

T
T.L.C. A.S.A.P. (1993), Myers/Baker - Alabama
That’s the Way We Roll – Crossin Dixon, Tim McDonald
The Art of Getting By - Eddy Raven
The Champ, B.Brandt/W.Brandt/Myers/Williams – Whiskey Falls
The Days You Live For (2009), Kirby/Myers - Matt Gary
The Game’s the Same - Earl Thomas Conley
The Heart Never Forgets, Baker/Myers/Williams - LeAnn Rimes
The House Won’t Rock, Myers/Miller - Sawyer Brown
The Moment – Hal Ketchum
The Road to You (1998), Tritt/Baker/Myers - Travis Tritt
The Song I Said I’d Never Write For You - Eddy Raven
The Trill - Kate Bradshaw
These Arms - Baker & Myers, All-4-One
Think About That - Richie McDonald
This House - Richie McDonald
This I Promise You - Ariel Rivera
This Ole House - Razorback
Those Days - Jim Glaser
Till You Love Me - The McClymont Sisters
Time – John David(Germany)
Tomorrow (2011), Young/Myers/Smith - Chris Young

U
Untouchable – Cathy Briar (One Life To Live)

V
Vegas Love - Donny & Marie

W
We Got all Night - Matt Gary
We Know Better Now - Dottie West
What's Left of Me - Matt Gary
What’s Up with That - Kate Bradshaw
What’s Wrong with That, Pfrimmer/McDonald/Myers - Lonestar
What I Miss the Most, Myers/Britt/McDonald - Lonestar
What If It’s Me, Myers/Stone – Andy Griggs
What Kind of Man (1995) - Marie Osmond
What Say You (2004), Bradford/Myers - Travis Tritt, John Mellencamp
What Would He Do - Richie McDonald
When Night Falls- Bradshaw/Myers/Silverlight - Kate Bradshaw
When Was the Last Time - Donna Ulisse
Who’s Your Daddy – Mike Walker
Why Santa's Fat - Richie McDonald
Wonder Drug - Elli Erl
Writing on the Wall - Anne West

Y
Years From Here- Baker & Myers, 4 P.M.
You and I (1982), Myers - Eddie Rabbitt & Crystal Gayle
You are My Life - Donny Osmond
You Should Have Been Gone by Now - Eddy Raven
You Should’ve Been There - The Shooters
You're All I Ever Wanted - Vibe
You're Never Too Old for Young Love - Eddy Raven
YOU AND I - Park Bom

Lists of songs by songwriters